In law, Article 10 may refer to:
 Article 10 of the European Convention on Human Rights
 Article 10 of the Constitution of Malaysia